Guiomys is an extinct genus of cavioid rodent which lived in west central Patagonia of Argentina (Collón Curá Formation), Bolivia (Honda Group) and Peru (Yahuarango Formation) during the Middle Miocene (Laventan). Guiomys is known from mandibular and maxillary fragments with molars, and isolated cheek teeth. It was first named by María E. Pérez in 2010 and the type species is Guiomys unica.

References 

Hystricognath rodents
Miocene rodents
Miocene mammals of South America
Laventan
Neogene Argentina
Fossils of Argentina
Cañadón Asfalto Basin
Neogene Bolivia
Fossils of Bolivia
Neogene Peru
Fossils of Peru
Fossil taxa described in 2010